Bloodymania 7 was a professional wrestling pay-per-view (PPV) event produced by Juggalo Championship Wrestling (JCW), which was only available online. It took place at midnight on August 11, 2013 at Hog Rock in Cave-In-Rock, Illinois. Professional wrestling is a type of sports entertainment in which theatrical events are combined with a competitive sport. The buildup to the matches and the scenarios that took place before, during, and after the event, were planned by JCW's script writers. The event starred wrestlers from Juggalo Championship Wrestling's bi-weekly internet wrestling show.

Six matches were held on the event's card. The main event match was a tag team match featuring 2 Tuff Tony and Vampiro defeating Kongo Kong and The Boogeyman. Featured matches on the undercard included a tag team match where the team of The Ring Rydas defeated Paul London and Brian Kendrick for the JCW Tag Team Championship, a singles match that saw The Rudeboy defeat Necro Butcher from a serious leg injury, and an 8-man Battle Royal match in which Matt Cross was victorious.

Background
Bloodymania 7 featured professional wrestling matches that involved different wrestlers from pre-existing scripted feuds, plots, and storylines that were played at Juggalo Championship Wrestling's bi-weekly events. Wrestlers were portrayed as either villains or heroes as they followed a series of events that built tension, and culminated in a wrestling match or series of matches. The event featured wrestlers from Juggalo Championship Wrestling's roster.

Results

References

External links
Juggalo Championship Wrestling’s official website

2013 in professional wrestling
2013
Professional wrestling in Illinois
2013 in Illinois
Events in Illinois